Chattahoochee State Park was a public recreation area located in the extreme southeast corner of Alabama operated by the government of Houston County, Alabama. The park occupied  along Irwin's Mill Creek on the Florida-Alabama border. It closed following the destruction of much of the park by Hurricane Michael in 2018.

History
Land near the park was the site of an 1818 skirmish in the First Seminole War. 

The state park was developed by members of the Civilian Conservation Corps during the 1930s. Their handiwork included a natural stone dam built to create the  CC Pond and the park's dirt roads. At one time, chimneys and other remnants of the camp where CCC workers lived could be found.

Before its closure, the park offered fishing, boating, campsites for RVs and tents, picnic area, beach, hiking trails, and dedicated equestrian trails.

The majority of the park's facilities and trees were destroyed by Hurricane Michael in October 2018; subsequently the park was permanently closed due to the state lacking sufficient funds to clear, repair and rebuild the park.

As of 2023, the park was still listed as a recreational facility on the Houston County government website.

References

External links
Chattahoochee State Park Houston County, Alabama

State parks of Alabama
Protected areas of Houston County, Alabama
Civilian Conservation Corps in Alabama
2019 disestablishments in Alabama
Alabama placenames of Native American origin